Little Seneca Lake is a reservoir located near the Boyds community in Montgomery County, Maryland.

Overview
The surface area of the lake is 505 acres (2.04 km2). The average depth is 24.7 feet (7.5 m) with a maximum depth of 68 feet (21 m). The capacity of the lake is 4.5 billion gallons (17 million m3).

The lake was created by the construction of a dam on Little Seneca Creek. It was built to provide an emergency water supply for the metropolitan Washington, D.C. area, and it also provides a recreational amenity for the public.

Drinking water supply

The lake was completed in 1984 and the water supply dam is operated by the Washington Suburban Sanitary Commission (WSSC). WSSC shares the drinking water resource with two adjacent public water suppliers, the Washington Aqueduct and the Fairfax County Water Authority.

Recreational facilities
The lake is located in Black Hill Regional Park. Fishing and boating facilities are available at the park. The lake is stocked for recreational fishing. Fish species found in the lake include largemouth bass, tiger muskie, channel catfish, sunfish, perch and crappie.

See also
Seneca Creek

References

External links
Seneca Creek Watershed Partners - Volunteer stewardship organization
Washington Suburban Sanitary Commission

Chesapeake Bay watershed
Reservoirs in Maryland
Lakes of Montgomery County, Maryland
Potomac River watershed